Samuel John Lomonaco, Jr.  is an American academic and mathematician who is a professor of computer science and electrical engineering at the University of Maryland, Baltimore County.

Background 
Lomonaco earned a Bachelor of Science degree in mathematics from Saint Louis University and a PhD in mathematics from Princeton University. Lomonaco specializes in quantum computation, topology, quantum information science, knot theory, and quantum algorithms.

References 

Living people
21st-century American mathematicians

Topologists
University of Maryland, Baltimore County faculty
Saint Louis University alumni
Princeton University alumni
1942 births